Vladimir Fadeev (born 26 April 1958) is a former international speedway rider from Russia.

Speedway career 
Fadeev is a two times individual world champion winning the gold medal at the Individual Ice Speedway World Championship in the 1993 Individual Ice Speedway World Championship and 1999 Individual Ice Speedway World Championship.

In addition he won the Team Ice Racing World Championship six times (1993, 1994, 1996, 1999, 2000 and 2001).

References 

Living people
1958 births
Russian speedway riders